Fayha or Fayhaa is an Arabic word which could refer to: 
Al-Fayhaa Association, a Non-profit organizations in Lebanon.
Fayha, Kuwait, a suburb in Kuwait. 
Al-Fayhaa Stadium, a soccer stadium in Syria.
Al-Fayhaa TV, a TV channel in Iraq.